Visa requirements for Chinese citizens of Hong Kong are administrative entry restrictions by the authorities of other states placed on holders of Hong Kong Special Administrative Region passports.

 Chinese citizens who are permanent residents of Hong Kong ( Hong Kong citizens) holding HK passports had visa-free or visa on arrival access to 171 countries and territories (tied with Argentina, Brazil, Croatia and the United Arab Emirates), ranking the HK passport 18th in terms of travel freedom according to the Henley Passport Index. The official figure provided by the Hong Kong Immigration Department of countries and territories granting visa-free access to Hong Kong SAR passport holders was 168 as of 8 August 2022. (However, this figure excludes countries and territories which are not officially recognised by the People's Republic of China, such as Kosovo and Taiwan so the practical figure relevant to travellers is actually higher.)

Due to its one country, two systems stance, the Government of Hong Kong can make a visa-waiver agreement for Chinese residents of Hong Kong with other countries. As a result of both bilateral visa abolition agreements (e.g. between Hong Kong and Russia) and unilateral decisions to grant visa exemptions (e.g. Myanmar), Hong Kong Special Administrative Region passport holders enjoy visa exemptions and simplified visa procedures to a large number of destinations worldwide. Whilst the visa exemptions mostly only apply when Chinese citizens of Hong Kong are visiting on short trips for pleasure or on business, a number of countries extend the visa exemption to short stays involving paid activities (e.g. Belgium and Luxembourg).

Hong Kong citizens may hold a HKSAR passport only if they are also permanent residents of Hong Kong and hold a valid Hong Kong Permanent Identity Card. This article deals only with the visa requirements for HKSAR passport holders, who due to the "One country, two systems" principle are not eligible to hold PRC passports, and vice versa. For PRC passport holders, check Visa requirements for Chinese citizens.

Visa requirements map

Greater China

Visa requirements
Visa requirements for holders of normal passports travelling for tourist purposes:

Territories
Visa requirements for Chinese citizens of Hong Kong for visits to various territories, disputed areas, partially recognised countries and restricted zones:

APEC Business Travel Card

Holders of an APEC Business Travel Card (ABTC)  travelling on business do not require a visa to the following countries:

1 – up to 90 days
2 – up to 60 days
3 – up to 59 days

Permanent residents with Chinese nationality ( holders of HKSAR passport/ BN(O) passport) are required to apply for a Mainland Travel Permit to enter  Mainland China, to the exclusion of all other documents.

The card must be used in conjunction with a passport and has the following advantages:
undertake legitimate business in participating economies
expedited border crossing in all member economies, including transitional members
expedited scheduling of visa interview (United States)

Non-visa restrictions

See also

Visa requirements for British Nationals (Overseas)
Visa requirements for Chinese citizens of Macau
Visa requirements for Chinese citizens (mainland)
Visa policy of Hong Kong
Hong Kong Special Administrative Region passport

Notes

References

External links
Official GovHK list of countries/territories offering visa-free access for Hong Kong SAR passport holders (Note: This list is not comprehensive as it excludes countries/territories without diplomatic relations with China)

China, Hong Kong
Foreign relations of Hong Kong